Brattvollsheia is a neighbourhood in the city of Kristiansand in Agder county, Norway. It is located in the borough of Oddernes in the district of Tveit. Brattvollsheia is immediately north of Kjevik Airport.

Transport

References

Geography of Kristiansand
Neighbourhoods of Kristiansand